The 1st Motorized Infantry Division was a division of the French Army that existed from 1939 - 1940.  It was involved in the Battle of France.  Although it didn't have a lot experience it was trained very well and had a lot of modern equipment.

History 
The 1st Motorized Infantry Division was formed in 1939 at Anzin as a Covering Division.  In late 1939 the division joined the 3rd Army Corps, later the "Groupe Moliné".  In mid 1940 the division was re-formed as the "1st Light Infantry Division".

Organization 
Structure of the division in 1940:

 Chef d'état-major de la 1er Division d'Infanterie Motorisée
 7ème Groupe de Reconnaissance Motorisé
Officier Commandant, de l'Infanterie Divisionnaire
1er Régiment de Infanterie Motorisée
43e Régiment d'Infanterie Motorisée
110e Régiment d'Infanterie Motorisée
Officer Commanding Divisional Artillery
14th Divisional Anti-Tank Company
10th Divisional Anti-Tank Battery
701st Anti-Aircraft Battery, 409e Régiment d'Artillerie
15e Régiment d'Artillerie Divisionnaire
215e Régiment d'Artillerie Lourde Divisionnaire
1st Divisional Artillery Park
1st Artisan Repair Company
201st Motorized Ammunition Section
1st Divisional Engineers
1/1st Engineer Company
1/2nd Engineer Company
1st Divisional Signals
1/81st Field Telegraph Company
1/82nd Radio Company
Officer Commanding Divisional Transport
1/201st Motorized Headquarters Company
1/301st Motorized Company
1st Divisional Medical Group
1st Divisional Training Center

References 

French Infantry divisions during World War II